Bilton is a hamlet in Northumberland, in England. It is situated near the River Aln, a short distance inland from the North Sea coast, close to Alnmouth. Alnwick is the nearest town.

History 
During medieval times Bilton was larger; it is recorded as having 8 taxpayers in 1296 and had become a more substantial village by the 18th century. However, the village shrank in the 19th century, when several farms were amalgamated.[1] Bilton was primarily an agricultural village; 17th century field systems are shown on a map of 1624. Coal mining is also recorded on Bilton Common in the 17th century.[2] Bilton is part of the civil parish of Lesbury, and is close to Hipsburn, and the location of Alnmouth railway station.

Governance 
Bilton is in the parliamentary constituency of Berwick-upon-Tweed.

References

External links

Hamlets in Northumberland